Jonathan Torres (born 11 September 1989) is a Colombian footballer who plays as a defender. He is currently a free agent.

Career
Torres made his professional debut for Deportivo Cali during the 2007 Categoría Primera A season, which preceded a 2008 move to Categoría Primera B side Córdoba. Three goals in twenty-two fixtures followed. 2009 saw Torres join Atlético La Sabana, months before he completed a passage through fellow tier two team Deportes Palmira. In 2010, Torres agreed to sign for Pacífico, a successor club of Deportes Palmira, making fifteen appearances and scoring one goal during the 2010 campaign. San Jorge of Torneo Federal B signed Torres in 2015. He scored once in nine matches for the Argentine club in two years.

Career statistics
.

References

External links

1989 births
Living people
Sportspeople from Valle del Cauca Department
Colombian footballers
Association football defenders
Colombian expatriate footballers
Expatriate footballers in Argentina
Colombian expatriate sportspeople in Argentina
Categoría Primera A players
Categoría Primera B players
Deportivo Cali footballers
Córdoba F.C. players
Atlético La Sabana footballers
Deportes Palmira players
Pacífico F.C. players